Sarcodontia setosa is a species of toothed crust fungus in the family Meruliaceae. It is a white rot species that found in Europe and North America.

Taxonomy
The fungus was originally described by Christiaan Hendrik Persoon in 1825 as Hydnum setosum. Marinus Anton Donk transferred it to the genus Sarcodontia in 1952.

Description
They are pale to bright yellow in colour, although both bruising and age tend to cause a reddish discolouration. The odour of the fungus has been described as "fruity but unpleasant".

Fruit bodies of the fungus contain the benzoquinone-derived compound sarcodontic acid, which impart the yellow colour. The fungus is inedible, but can be used as a mushroom dye, and produces a pinkish-brown colour with a variety of mordants.

References

Fungi described in 1825
Fungi of Europe
Fungi of North America
Inedible fungi
Meruliaceae
Taxa named by Christiaan Hendrik Persoon